CFSL is a Canadian radio station licensed to Weyburn, Saskatchewan. Owned by Golden West Broadcasting, it broadcasts a country format on the assigned frequency of 1190 kHz, and serves the southeast portion of the province. The station shares studios with CKRC-FM and CHWY-FM at 305 Souris Avenue in downtown Weyburn.

History
CFSL signed on in 1957 under the ownership of Soo Line Broadcasting Ltd., serving both Weyburn and Estevan (until the launch of its sister station CJSL in Estevan in 1961). Starting on 1340 kHz, it moved to its current frequency at 1190 kHz around 1991.

Soo Line Broadcasting, and both CJSL and CFSL would be acquired by Golden West Broadcasting in 1995. In 2006, CFSL would gain a sister FM station, CKRC-FM.

Programming
CFSL currently broadcasts a full service country format. CFSL also carries Toronto Blue Jays baseball games.

References

External links

 

Fsl
Fsl
Fsl
Weyburn
Radio stations established in 1957
1957 establishments in Saskatchewan